Recovery or Recover may refer to:

Arts and entertainment

Books
 Recovery (novel), a Star Wars e-book
 Recovery Version, a translation of the Bible with footnotes published by Living Stream Ministry

Film and television
 Recovery (film), a 2007 BBC television drama
 Recovery (TV series), a 1996 television series from ABC TV
 "Recovery" (NCIS), a 2012 episode of the tenth season of NCIS
 "Recovery", a 2013 episode of the fifth season of NCIS: Los Angeles

Music
 Recover (band), a post-hardcore band from Austin, Texas

Albums and EPs 
 Recover, 2007 EP by Florida band Automatic Loveletter
 Recover, Vol. 1, 2016 EP by Amy Lee
 Recovery (ApologetiX album), a 2009 album by ApologetiX
 Recovery (Algebra Blessett album), a 2014 album from singer Algebra
 Recover (Confide album), a 2010 album by American metalcore band Confide
 Recovery (Eminem album), a 2010 Grammy-winning album by Eminem and best-selling album of 2010
 Recover (Great White album), 2002 glam-rock album
 Recover (The Naked and Famous album), 2020 pop album
 Recovery (Runrig album), a 1981 concept album by Scottish band Runrig
 Recovery (Loudon Wainwright album), a 2008 album
 Recovery (Quando Rondo album), 2023

Songs 
 "Recover" (song), a 2006 song by Welsh band The Automatic
 "Recover", 2013 song by Device from the deluxe edition of Device
 "Recovery", 2005 song by Funeral for a Friend from Hours
 "Recovery" (James Arthur song), 2013 single by James Arthur from his eponymous album
 "Recovery" (Justin Bieber song), 2013 single by Justin Bieber, part of Music Mondays series and album Journals
 "Recovery", title track on the Scottish band Runrig 1981 album Recovery listed above

Health
 Addiction recovery groups, voluntary associations of people who share a common desire to overcome drug addiction
 Convalescence, the gradual recovery of health and strength after illness, injury, or operation
 Cure, the end of a medical condition
 Hair of the dog, or "recovery drinking", the practice of drinking off a hangover
 Healing, the process of the restoration of health from an unbalanced, diseased or damaged organism
 Wound healing, the physical/mechanical form
 Recovery International, a self-help mental health program based on the work of the late Abraham A. Low, M.D.
Recovery model, an approach to mental disorder or substance dependence, emphasizes and supports a person's potential for recovery
Recovery position, a body position used in first aid
 RECOVERY Trial, a British clinical trial programme for treatments for COVID-19
 Post-anesthesia care unit, also known as the recovery room, used after surgery

Ownership
 Civil recovery, legal return of property obtained through unlawful means
 Common recovery, a fictitious legal proceeding in England
 Recovery, the finding and reporting of a ringed bird
 Recovery or repossession, recovering ownership of property

Science and technology
 Recovery (metallurgy), a change in the microstructure in polycrystalline materials
Recovery boiler, generating energy during papermaking
Recovery effect, a phenomenon in batteries
 Data recovery, a process of salvaging inaccessible data 
Photo recovery, the process of salvaging digital photographs
Automatic system recovery, the process of extracting any valid data from a device after a corruption, bootloop, or soft brick, usually followed by reinstalling the system image
 Disaster recovery, continuation of vital technology infrastructure and systems following a natural or human-induced disaster
Recovery, when the threats to species survival are neutralized under an endangered species recovery plan created pursuant to the U.S. Endangered Species Act of 1973
 Recovery, extraction of petroleum, the primary, secondary or tertiary recovery of petroleum
 Forensic recovery, where a search and rescue mission involves, or transitions to, missing persons expected to be dead rather than alive
 Resource recovery, the collection of recyclable materials

Vehicles and vessels
 Recovery truck or recovery vehicle, used to move or assist other vehicles
Vehicle recovery (military), a type of military operation conducted to extricate vehicles that have become immobile
  – one of several ships by that name

Other uses 
 Recovery auditing, a systematic review of financial transactions
 Recovery, Georgia, a community in the United States
 Recovery Glacier, Antarctica
 Recovery Hill, U.S. Virgin Islands, a settlement on Saint Croix

See also
 Recovering